The global silver between the Americas, Europe and China from the sixteenth to nineteenth centuries was a spillover of the Columbian Exchange which had a profound effect on the world economy. Many scholars consider the silver trade to mark the beginning of a genuinely global economy, with one historian noting that silver "went round the world and made the world go round." Although global, much of that silver ended up in the hands of the Chinese, as they accepted it as a form of currency. In addition to the global economic changes the silver trade engendered, it also put into motion a wide array of political transformations in the early modern era. "New World mines", concluded several prominent historians, "supported the Spanish empire", acting as a linchpin of the Spanish economy.

Spaniards at the time of the Age of Discovery discovered vast amounts of silver, much of which was from the Potosí silver mines, to fuel their trade economy. Potosí's deposits were rich and Spanish American silver mines were the world's cheapest sources of it. The Spanish acquired the silver, minting it into the peso de ocho to then use it as a means of purchase; that currency was so widespread that even the United States accepted it as valid until the Coinage Act of 1857. As the Spanish need for silver increased, new innovations for more efficient extraction of silver were developed, such as the amalgamation method of using mercury to extract silver from ore.

In the two centuries that followed the discovery of Potosí in 1545, the Spanish silver mines in the Americas produced 40,000 tons of silver. Altogether, more than 150,000 tons of silver were shipped from Potosí by the end of the 18th century. From 1500 to 1800, Bolivia and Mexico produced about 80% of the world's silver with 30% of it eventually ending up in China. In the late 16th and early 17th century, Japan was also exporting heavily into China and the foreign trade at large.

As has been demonstrated, China dominated silver imports. The market value of silver in the Ming territory was double its value elsewhere, which provided great arbitrage profit for the Europeans and Japanese. The abundance of silver in China made it easy for the country to mint it into coinage. That process was so widespread that local Chinese government officials would demand taxes to be paid in silver to the point that silver eventually backed all of China's economy.

Silver in the Americas 

A major drive of the Spanish colonization of the Americas during the late 15th and 16th centuries was the discovery, production, and trading of precious metals at a time when there was a severe shortage of them. The Spanish, along with other European nations, likewise had a great desire for Chinese goods such as silk and porcelain. Conversely, the Europeans did not have any goods or commodities which China desired, so they traded their newly mined silver from the Americas which was badly needed in China at the time due to long running silver shortages, in order to make up for their trade deficit. The two most important mining colonies of the Spanish Empire were Bolivia and Mexico, who were estimated to have provided one-hundred thousand tons of silver from the mid-16th century to the end of the colonial period in 1824. The richest and most productive mine in the Americas was that of Potosí then located within the Viceroyalty of Peru, in what is now modern day Bolivia. The richest camp in Mexico was in the city of Zacatecas, then a part of the Viceroyalty of New Spain. However, the production of this mine was far less than that of Potosi.

Mining processes in the Americas 
Relatively simple mining and processing techniques of the Incas and other indigenous people dominated American silver mining for the early part of the 16th century. However, mining in the Americas became reliant on mercury amalgamation after it was developed and popularized in the mid-16th century. Mercury amalgamation dramatically increased the volume of silver production in the Americas, giving way to silver's central role in American economies and the burgeoning global economy. From 1575 to 1590, the use of amalgamation multiplied the output of Potosí, the most prominent Andean silver mine, by six. The presence of mercury at Huancavelica coupled with the abundance of cheap labor supplied by the rotational labor system mita made this intense production possible. Mercury amalgamation was invented by a Spaniard in central Mexico in the 1550s. Historians dispute what individual was the first to invent the process, however most agree that it was a Spaniard. Mercury was the one of the highest costs of production for the Americas, since much of it had to be shipped from Almadén in Spain. The ratio of mercury to silver produced was about two to one. Furthermore, German miners introduced the stamp mill and lead smelting in the 1530s. Gunpowder was often used to blast large holes to create the mine shafts, although there were not many deep shafts. Potosí had the most ore, however it was lower quality than that of Mexico.

Mining production in the Americas largely depended on native Amerindian labor in both Mexico and Bolivia. In Mexico, many of the natives worked as wage laborers by the middle of the 17th century. However, the labor system known as the  still existed in some places. Silver production in Mexico was relatively cheap when compared to that of Bolivia, and the general trend of Mexican labor systems was that towards waged labor. In Bolivia's mines, the mit'a system was a dominant form of native labor subjection, although waged laborers worked on the mines as well. Natives under the mit'a system were paid much less, and this was necessary for the production of silver to continue in Bolivia where costs were relatively high.

First paper money
The world's first paper money ("flying money") was invented by the Chinese and they needed some commodity to back it. Traditional coins were useful, but the amount of coins needed for large purchases could be bulky and dangerous to transport. That problem was solved when the Chinese created small pieces of paper with pictures of the coin printed on them. By the nature of their geography, China had no real amount of precious metals of their own to back the paper money they invented. Because the Spaniards didn't find gold but did find copious amounts of silver in Bolivia and Mexico, the Spaniards and the rest of Europe used this silver to purchase the commodities of choice from China, solving both of their problems.

Global flow of silver 
The ultimate destination for much of the silver produced in the Americas and Japan was China. Silver from the Americas flowed mostly across the Atlantic and made its way to the Far East. A popular route was around the Cape of Good Hope into the east, and sometimes it came over land. Major outposts for the silver trade were located in Southeast Asian countries, such as the Spanish Philippines. The city of Manila served as a primary outpost of the exchange of goods between the Americas, Japan, India, Indonesia and China. However, there is a large amount of silver that was transported across the vast Pacific Ocean directly from the Americas as well, via the famed Manila Galleons. There are not many records of the amount of silver which crossed the Pacific due to it being discouraged by the Spanish monarchy, so estimates highly vary.

During the 16th and 17th centuries, a large amount of silver also remained in the Americas, accumulated through the business of local merchants. Royal officials in various parts of Spanish America often protected the activities of local merchants and enacted protectionist policies that encouraged local monopolies. This meant that royal officials were not solely interested in accumulating silver for Spain's economy, but rather, they also had a vested interest in developing the economies of their specific localities. Additionally, much of the silver that was eventually exported still circulated extensively in the Americas before finding its way to port cities for export. Even when this exchanged silver eventually ended up in Buenos Aires or another port city where it was exported, it facilitated numerous transactions within the Americas before it got there.

Silver also found its way across other parts of the world as well. India and Europe both received a fair amount of silver. This silver was often locally traded for other commodities, such as gold or crops. In India, silver flowed from the south to the north, and gold flowed the opposite way. Often silver and gold were manufactured into jewelry or hoarded as treasure.

China and the demand for silver 
China was the ultimate destination in which silver would flow towards. In exchange, the Chinese traded their popular goods such as silk and porcelain. China had a high demand for silver due to its shift from paper money to coins in the early period of the Ming dynasty. The Ming paper currency eventually failed due to self-imposed inflation along with an inability to stop the production of counterfeit bills. The Ming attempted to produce copper coins as a new form of currency, but production was inconsistent. Hence silver became of high value because it was a valid currency that could be processed abroad. The bimetallic ratio of silver to gold was about two to one, which meant that European and Japanese merchants made a large amount of profit. In the 1640s, the bimetallic ratios in China converged with the rest of the world, before experiencing another population boom. The new population boom was a product of the introduction of New World crops into China, mainly sweet potatoes, which could be more easily grown. By this time, the silver mines in Japan were largely depleted and the New World became China's primary source for silver.

Initially, Japan served as China's primary source for silver in the 16th century. In exchange for silver, China would provide Japan with silk and gold. Japan and China did not directly trade with each other, due to political tensions. This meant that European entities and countries, such as the Dutch and Portuguese served as a middle man between the two countries.

China's silver dominance 
In the famed The Wealth of Nations, Adam Smith noted the sheer force and great reach of the global silver trade. He was impressed by its market value but more intrigued with the way this single item of commerce brought together new and old worlds i.e. the Americas and China. Although China acted as the cog running the wheel of global trade, Japan's huge contribution of silver exports to China were critical to the world economy and China's liquidity and success with the commodity. Historians posit Europeans would have been left out of world trade, and China may have fallen prey to conquest by settlers of the Americas, if not for Japanese silver mining. Silver was paramount to East Asia's introduction into the global trade market. Under the Ming and Qing empires, China hoarded silver to boost its economy and increase its trading power.

Many historians argue that silver was responsible for the birth of global economics and trade. According to this view, global trade commenced in 1571 when Manila was founded and became the first trading post linking America and Asia due to the expansive and profitable silver trade. Scholars find the amount of silver traveling from Manila to China was approximately three million pesos or 94,000 kilograms in the early 1600s.

The rarity of silver production was seen as an opportunity for China to control the currency's value and support its own national currency. Silver was one of the only accepted trade items from Europeans and its value in China was astronomical compared to rest of the world. Between 1600 and 1800 China received 100 tons of silver on average per year. A large populace near the Lower Yangtze averaged a hundreds of taels of silver per household in the late 16th century.

Later on, the sudden ban on Spanish silver imports to China imposed by the Qing dynasty after defeating the Ming in 1644, along with a long period of economic stagnation and recession due to famines and bad financial policies back in Spain, simultaneously combined with devastating losses sustained towards the end of the Thirty Years War, all precipitated the significant decline of the Spanish Empire in the second half of the 17th century, and its eclipse by France, and, later, Great Britain.

Silver even played a large role when defending Toyotomi Hideyoshi's attempted take over of Joseon Korea. The Ming Ministry of War sent approximately 140,000 liang of silver to its soldiers and required provinces to provide silver as tax for the war effort as well. In the sixteenth century, the daimyos of Southwest Japan hoped for unhinged global trade but were stopped due to Ming China trade policies. Still, Japan became a player in the global economy via frequent Wokou ships arriving to extract Japan's abundance of silver and exchange goods. Japan increased its wealth through successful trilateral trade with Portugal and China as Japan now had Chinese goods to offer the Portuguese who had silver mines of their own. Founder of the Ming China dynasty, Hongwu, actually sought to eliminate silver from the market due to his fear of inflation which he previously experienced in the Yuan dynasty. His attempt involved imposing harsh limits on silver mining to stop its flow into the market and subsequently replaced it with baochao or paper money. However, the currency never popularized and silver proved its mainstay as a global currency.

Opium imports

Despite some restrictions, silver continued to drive trade through its popularity in Europe. This, combined with a high British demand for Chinese tea, created chronic trade deficits for European governments, which were forced to risk silver deficits to supply merchants in Asia. As supplies of silver decreased in Europe, Europeans had less ability to purchase highly coveted Chinese goods. Merchants were no longer able to sustain the China trade through profits made by selling Chinese goods in the West and were forced to take bullion out of circulation in Europe to buy goods in China.

In the late 18th century, British merchants from the East India Company began to introduce Indian opium to Chinese markets. The demand for opium rose rapidly and was so profitable that Chinese opium dealers began to seek out more suppliers of the drug, thus inaugurating the opium trade; one merchant declared that Opium "is like gold. It can sell any time." From 1804 to 1820, a period when the Qing dynasty needed to finance the suppression of the White Lotus Rebellion, Chinese merchants were soon exporting silver to pay for opium rather than Europeans paying for Chinese goods with the precious metal.

The Qing imperial court debated whether and how to end the opium trade, eventually settling on regulations on consumption. That measure, however, resulted in an increase in drug smuggling by Europeans and Chinese traders. In 1810, the Daoguang Emperor issued an edict concerning the matter, declaring, "Opium has a harm. Opium is a poison, undermining our good customs and morality. Its use is prohibited by law." Following a debate at court in 1836 on whether to legalize the drug or crack down on its use, the emperor decided on the latter. An upright official, Commissioner Lin Zexu led the campaign against opium as a kind of "drug czar." The British, offended by the seizure of their property in opium, sent a large naval expedition to China to end the restrictive conditions under which they had long traded with that country. Thus began the first Opium War, in which Britain's industrialized military might was proven in China's rout. The Treaty of Nanking, which ended the war in 1842 largely on British terms, imposed numerous restrictions on Chinese sovereignty and opened five ports to European traders.

See also
 Silver mining
 Bullionism
 Price revolution
 Economic history of China before 1912
 Spanish Empire
 Dutch East India Company
 East India Company
 Trade dollar (United States coin)

References

Further reading
 Atwell, William S. "Notes on silver, foreign trade, and the late Ming economy." Ch'ing-shih wen-t'i 3.8 (1977): 1-33. excerpt
 Bohorquez, Jesús. "Linking the Atlantic and Indian Oceans: Asian textiles, Spanish silver, global capital, and the financing of the Portuguese–Brazilian slave trade (c. 1760–1808)." Journal of Global History 15.1 (2020): 19–38. online
 Derks, Hans. History of the Opium Problem: The Assault on the East, ca. 1600-1950 (Brill, 2012)
 Flynn, Dennis O., and Arturo Giráldez. "Born with a 'silver spoon': The origin of world trade in 1571." Journal of World History (1995): 201–221. online also online
 Flynn, Dennis O., and Arturo Giráldez. "Cycles of silver: global economic unity through the mid-eighteenth century." Journal of World History (2002): 391–427. online
 Flynn, Dennis, and Arturo Giraldez. "Latin American Silver and the Early Globalization of World Trade." in National Identities and Sociopolitical Changes in Latin America (2013): 140–159.
 Giráldez, Dennis O. Flynn-Arturo. "Silver and Ottoman monetary history in global perspective." Journal of European Economic History (2002): 9+ online.
 Gordon, Peter. The Silver Way: China, Spanish America and the Birth of Globalisation, 1565-1815 (Penguin 2017), 100pp excerpt
 Hung, Ho-fung. "Imperial China and capitalist Europe in the eighteenth-century global economy." Review (Fernand Braudel Center) 24#4 (2001): 473–513. online
 Irigoin, Alejandra. "The end of a silver era: the consequences of the breakdown of the Spanish peso standard in China and the United States, 1780s–1850s." Journal of World History 20.2 (2009): 207–244. excerpt
 Irigoin, Alejandra. "Rise and demise of the global silver standard." in Handbook of the History of Money and Currency (2020): 383–410.
 Marsilio, Claudio. "The Genoese and Portuguese Financial Operators' Control of the Spanish Silver Market (1627-1657)." Journal of European Economic History 41.3 (2012): 69+.
 Matthee, Rudolph P. The Politics of Trade in Safavid Iran: Silk for Silver, 1600-1730 (Cambridge University Press, 2000)
 Schiltz, Michael. Accounting for the Fall of Silver: Hedging Currency Risk in Long-Distance Trade with Asia, 1870-1913 (Oxford University Press, 2020) 
 Stein, Stanley J., and Barbara H. Stein. Silver, trade, and war: Spain and America in the making of early modern Europe (JHU Press, 2000). excerpt
 TePaske, John J. A new world of gold and silver. Brill, 2010.
 TePaske, John J. The Royal Treasuries of the Spanish Empire in America, 2 vol (1982) vol1 online also vol 2 online
 Xiantang, Li. "The Paradoxical Effect of Silver in the Economies of Ming and Qing China: On the New Myth Created by the 'Global Economic View' of Andre Gunder Frank and Kenneth Pomeranz." Chinese Studies in History 45.1 (2011): 84-99. https://doi.org/10.2753/CSH0009-4633450105
 Xu, Jin. Empire of Silver: A New Monetary History of China (Yale University Press, 2021). excerpt
 Zhuang, Guotu. Tea, silver, opium and war : the international tea trade and Western commercial expansion into China in 1740-1840'' (Xiamen University Press, 1993)  World Cat

Early Modern economics
Silver
Globalization